Clinton is an unincorporated census-designated place (CDP) in Prince George's County, Maryland, United States. Clinton was formerly known as Surrattsville until after the time of the Civil War. The population of Clinton was 38,760 at the 2020 census. Clinton is historically known for its role in the American Civil War concerning the Abraham Lincoln assassination.  Clinton is adjacent to Camp Springs, Rosaryville, Melwood, and Andrews Air Force Base.

Geography
Clinton is located at  (38.763711, −76.895458).

Demographics

2020 census

Note: the US Census treats Hispanic/Latino as an ethnic category. This table excludes Latinos from the racial categories and assigns them to a separate category. Hispanics/Latinos can be of any race.

2000 Census
As of the census of 2000, there were 26,064 people, 8,605 households, and 6,772 families residing in the CDP. The racial makeup of the CDP was 20.56% white, 73.69% black, 0.47% Native American, 2.47% Asian, 0.02% Pacific Islander, 0.72% from other races, and 2.08% from two or more races. Hispanic or Latino of any race were 1.90% of the population.

There were 8,605 households, out of which 38.5% had children under the age of 18 living with them, 58.8% were married couples living together, 15.2% had a female householder with no husband present, and 21.3% were non-families. 17.4% of all households were made up of individuals, and 5.3% had someone living alone who was 65 years of age or older. The average household size was 2.96 and the average family size was 3.32.

In the CDP, the population was spread out, with 27.2% under the age of 18, 6.7% from 18 to 24, 30.7% from 25 to 44, 26.4% from 45 to 64, and 9.1% who were 65 years of age or older. The median age was 37 years. For every 100 females, there were 89.1 males. For every 100 females age 18 and over, there were 84.8 males.

The median income for a household in the CDP was $71,139, and the median income for a family was $75,036 (these figures had risen to $90,285 and $97,640 respectively as of a 2007 estimate). Males had a median income of $41,736 versus $39,545 for females. The per capita income for the CDP was $24,949. About 2.4% of families and 3.4% of the population were below the poverty line, including 2.5% of those under age 18 and 10.2% of those age 65 or over.

History 
Clinton was founded in the 1770s. The town, then named Surratt's Villa, was actually a simple crossroads with a few buildings. In the 1800s, it became known as Surrattsville. The main building served as the post office, an inn and tavern, and a polling place. This main residence was one of two properties owned by the widowed Mary Surratt; the second property was in Washington, D.C.

On 14 and 15 April 1865, John Wilkes Booth, who had two hours earlier assassinated President Abraham Lincoln, stopped by the Surrattsville tavern to pick up weapons and supplies. The U.S. government alleged that Mary Surratt had gone there earlier with these supplies, and was in collusion with the conspirators, one of whom was her son, John Surratt. Because she was found guilty of complicity in the Lincoln assassination, Mary Surratt was hanged at the Capitol Prison in Washington D.C., on 7 July 1865. (Her house is now the Surratt House Museum, with a focus on the assassination.) The U.S. Post Office renamed the town Robeystown, due to the notoriety of the Surratt name, and in keeping with naming towns after the postmaster.

In 1879, Robeystown was renamed Clinton. The local high school, however, retains the name of Surrattsville, and some locals continue, in common usage, to call the town "Surattsville".

The Wyoming house, a historic frame house built in three phases between the 18th and early 19th centuries, is also a part of Clinton's history. The house consists of a main block with gambrel roof (late 18th century), kitchen (c. 1800), and connecting block (c. 1850). The Wyoming house is listed in the Maryland Inventory of Historical Properties and the Historic American Buildings Survey.

In 1913, Blossie Keubeth Miller founded a general store at the town's main intersection. The current commercial property, built in the 1950s, houses a liquor store and is still owned by the Miller family.

Clinton has mostly single-family housing, but includes a few townhouse developments and one retirement mid-rise. Southern Maryland Regional Hospital is in Clinton, as is a private airfield. Louise F. Cosca Regional Park, a public facility operated by the Maryland-National Capital Park and Planning Commission, offers camping, hiking, fishing in a lake, an excellent playground, and a nature museum with nature activities. Clinton boasts a major shopping complex as well, and has a large fringe parking lot nearby where Metro buses take passengers a few miles to the Branch Avenue station of the Washington Metrorail system. Clinton is also home to the James O. Hall Research Center which is located on the premises of the Surratts House.

Major local growth began in the 1950s, spurred partly by the expansion of adjacent Andrews Air Force Base, home of the Air Force Systems Command and the President's plane Air Force One.

Yuri Nosenko a KGB defector, was confined and interrogated at a safehouse in Clinton from April 4, 1964 to August 13, 1965.

A movie titled The Photon Effect was filmed in the town and also in Baltimore. A movie titled Safehouse was filmed in Clinton in 2007.  Among the actors who flew out from Los Angeles to act in the film was Luke Barnett, who grew up in Clinton and graduated from Grace Brethren Christian School in 2000.

Clinton is also associated with the 2002 Beltway sniper attacks. A survivor of the attacks was shot in Clinton, while Mildred Muhammad, ex-wife of sniper John Allen Muhammad, was a Clinton resident.

Government and infrastructure
Prince George's County Police Department District 5 Station in Clinton CDP serves the community.

The U.S. Postal Service operates the Clinton Post Office.

Education
In the 2016 budget, Clinton schools spent approximately $14,000 per student. 

By average, there are 18 pupils per teacher, 789 students per librarian, and 431 children per counselor in Clinton (zip 20735), MD schools.

Primary and secondary schools
Prince George's County Public Schools operates public schools serving the census-designated place. The CDP is served by the following schools:

Elementary:
 Clinton Grove Elementary School - in the Clinton CDP
 James Ryder Randall Elementary School - in the Clinton CDP
 Waldon Woods Elementary School - in the Clinton CDP
 Francis T. Evans Elementary School - Adjacent to the Clinton CDP in the Andrews AFB CDP
 Melwood Elementary School
 Rose Valley Elementary School
 Tayac Elementary School

Middle:
 Stephen Decatur Middle School - in the Clinton CDP
 James Madison Middle School
 Gwynn Park Middle School
 Isaac J. Gourdine Middle School

High:
 Surrattsville High School - in the Clinton CDP
 Frederick Douglass High School
 Gwynn Park High School
 Dr. Henry A. Wise High School
 Friendly High School

Other:
 Tanglewood Regional

Private schools
 Clinton Christian School
 Grace Brethren Christian Church and School
 Henson Valley Academy
 Independent Baptist Academy
 Jabez Christian Academy
 Outreach Christian Center Academy
 St. John the Evangelist School
 St. Mary's of Piscataway Catholic School and Church

Public libraries
The Prince George's County Memorial Library System operates the Surratts-Clinton Branch in Clinton.

Notable people
 Luke Barnett, actor known for his Funny or Die episodes
 Tray Chaney, actor in The Wire as "Poot"
 Dante Cunningham, basketball player, power forward for New Orleans Pelicans
 Joe Haden, NFL defensive back
 Marcia Gay Harden, Academy Award-winning actress
 Taraji P. Henson, Golden Globe-winning and Academy Award-nominated actress
 Ty Lawson, basketball player
 Rodney McLeod, NFL defensive back
 Thomas V. Mike Miller, Jr., Maryland State Senate President 
 Yuri Nosenko, KGB defector
 Patrick O’Connell, 3-Star Michelin Chef and owner of The Inn at Little Washington
 Claire O'Dell, Lambda Literary Award-winning author
 Chris Rice, CCM singer/songwriter
 Tank, R&B singer
 Delonte West, NBA basketball player
 Brian Westbrook, NFL running back
 Laura Wright, actress
 Trevor Keels, NBA basketball player

References

Populated places established in the 1770s
Census-designated places in Prince George's County, Maryland
Census-designated places in Maryland
1770s establishments in Maryland
Unincorporated communities in Prince George's County, Maryland